Agyneta sheffordiana is a species of sheet weaver found in Canada. It was described by Duperre & Paquin in 2007.

References

sheffordiana
Spiders described in 2007
Spiders of North America
Endemic fauna of Canada